Francesca da Rimini, Op. 25, is an opera in a prologue, two tableaux and an epilogue by Sergei Rachmaninoff to a Russian libretto by Modest Ilyich Tchaikovsky. It is based on the story of Francesca da Rimini in the fifth canto of Dante's epic poem The Inferno (the first part of the Divine Comedy). The fifth canto is the part about the Second Circle of Hell (Lust). Rachmaninoff had composed the love duet for Francesca and Paolo in 1900, but did not resume work on the opera until 1904. The first performance was on 24 January (O.S. 11 January) 1906 at the Bolshoi Theatre, Moscow, with the composer himself conducting, in a double-bill performance with another Rachmaninoff opera written contemporaneously, The Miserly Knight.

Roles

Synopsis 
The setting is the Malatesta castle around the end of the 13th century

Prologue 
The ghost of Virgil leads the poet Dante to the edge of the first circle of the Inferno. They descend into the second, where the wordless chorus of the damned souls is heard. Virgil tells Dante that this is the realms where sinners given over to lust are punished, buffeted by an eternal whirlwind. Dante asks two such souls, Francesca and Paolo, to tell their story.

Tableau 1 
In the castle courtyard, Lanciotto Malatesta is about to go off to war, but he admits that he no longer takes pleasure in war. Lanciotto is deformed, and knows that his wife, Francesca, does not love him. She had been tricked into marrying Lanceotto by being led to think that she would marry Paolo Malatesta, Lanciotto's handsome younger brother. Lanciotto is suspicious of Francesca and envious of Paolo. He plans to set a trap to catch them in adultery. Francesca then enters, affirming obedience to Lanciotto, but saying that she cannot love him. She asks when he will return, and Lanciotto says that he will not return until after the end of battle. When Francesca leaves, Lanciotto laughs.

Tableau 2 
Paolo and Francesca are together, alone, in a room in the castle. Paolo tells the story of Sir Lancelot and Queen Guinevere, which parallels their own feelings. While doing so, Paolo declares his love for Francesca. Francesca resists initially, trying to remain faithful to Lanciotto. However, her own resistance erodes at Paolo's continued expressions of love, and her own desire for him. They sing of their secret love, and embrace. Lanciotto has returned, and sees the lovers together. He fatally stabs Paolo and Francesca.

Epilogue 
Paolo and Francesca recede into the whirlwind of the second circle. Dante is overcome with pity and terror, and he and Virgil remain with the thought:  'There is no greater sadness in the world than to remember a time of joy in a time of grief'.

Recordings
 Melodiya: Mikhail Maslov (Virgil's Shade), Alexander Laptev (Dante), Yevgeny Nesterenko (Lanciotto Malatesta), Makvala Kasrashvili (Francesca), Vladimir Atlantov (Paolo); Orchestra and Chorus of the Bolshoi Theater; Mark Ermler, conductor
 Deutsche Grammophon 453 455–2 (1997): Sergei Aleksashkin (Virgil's Shade), Ilya Levinsky (Dante), Sergei Leiferkus (Lanciotto Malatesta), Maria Guleghina (Francesca), Sergej Larin (Paolo); Gothenburg Opera Chorus; Gothenburg Symphony Orchestra; Neeme Järvi, conductor
 Russian Season: Nikolai Rechetniak (Virgil's Shade), Nikolai Vassiliev (Dante), Vladimir Matorin (Lanciotto Malatesta), Marina Lapina (Francesca), Vitaly Taraschenko Paolo); Russian State Choir; Bolshoi Theatre Orchestra; Andrey Chistiakov, conductor
 Chandos (CHAN10442): Gennady Bezzubenkov (Virgil's Shade), Evgeny Akimov (Dante), Sergey Murzaev (Lanciotto Malatesta), Svetla Vassileva (Francesca), Misha Didyk (Paolo); BBC Singers; BBC Philharmonic; Gianandrea Noseda, conductor

References

External links 
 Boosey & Hawkes page on Rachmaninoff's Francesca da Rimini
 Andrew Huth, Notes and synopsis on Rachmaninoff's Francesca da Rimini for May 2007 BBC Philharmonic performance
 Julian Grant, Doomed Lovers, programme note on Rachmaninoff's Francesca da Rimini for Opera North's 2004 production

Operas by Sergei Rachmaninoff
Operas
1906 operas
Russian-language operas
Operas set in Italy
Music based on poems
Operas based on real people
Cultural depictions of Francesca da Rimini
Operas set in the 13th century
Works based on Inferno (Dante)
Operas based on works by Dante Alighieri